is a passenger railway station located in the city of Komatsushima, Tokushima Prefecture, Japan. It is operated by JR Shikoku and has the station number "M06".

Lines

Layout
The station consists of an island platform serving two tracks. The station building houses a waiting room and a JR ticket window (without a Midori no Madoguchi facility). Access to the island platform is by means of a level crossing and ramp. There is a designated parking area for bicycles outside the station building.

Platforms

Adjacent stations

History
On 1 July 1936, the Anan Railway was nationalized and became part of the Mugi Line, operated by Japanese Government Railways (JGR). On 1 April 1987, with the privatization of Japanese National Railways (JNR), the successor of JGR, JR Shikoku took over control of the station.

On 1 February 2012, Komatsushima City set up a tourist information centre on the premises of the station.

Passenger statistics
In fiscal 2018, the station was used by an average of 1862 passengers daily

Surrounding area
Komatsushima City Hall
Komatsushima City Health Center
Komatsushima City Minami Komatsushima Elementary School
Tokushima Prefectural Komatsushima High School

See also
 List of Railway Stations in Japan

References

External links

 JR Shikoku timetable

Railway stations in Tokushima Prefecture
Railway stations in Japan opened in 1916
Komatsushima, Tokushima